Poipet is a boomtown on the Cambodian-Thai border, in Poipet Municipality, Banteay Meanchey Province. It is a key crossing point between the two countries, and also extremely popular as a gambling destination as gambling is popular, but mostly illegal in Thailand.   

Poipet is adjacent to the town of Aranyaprathet on the Thai side of the border. The town came into existence only quite recently for the express purpose of border trade; Sisophon had always been the primary urban center in what had been an agricultural area. Poipet's population has increased from 43,366 in the 1998 census to 89,549 in the 2008 census, making it the fourth most populous settlement in Cambodia just ahead of Sihanoukville and larger than its provincial capital Sisophon.

Transport
The Poipet border is a terminus of the Cambodia railway system, though in 2006 restoring of a link from Poipet to the present Cambodian Railways railhead at Sisophon was proposed. In the fall of 2008, an agreement was prepared to have an Australian company carry out this work. In 2009, Thailand passed legislation to extend the railway from Aranyaprathet to Poipet, and in 2018 the railway line has been reactivated.

On 22 December 2022, Prime Minister Hun Sen said that the government has been conducting studies on high-speed railways connecting domestically and to neighbouring countries. “We are conducting studies on high-speed railways connecting Phnom Penh to Preah Sihanouk province and to the border with Thailand.”

Casinos in the city
There is a strip of casinos and hotels between the Cambodian and Thai passport control counters, enabling Thais and other foreigners to gamble in Cambodia without needing to go through Cambodian immigration. In Cambodia, gambling is illegal for Cambodian citizens but not for holders of foreign passports. There is another border on the Cambodian side of this strip area that one needs to pass before being free to travel within the rest of the country.

On 28 December 2022, a fire at the Grand Diamond City Hotel and Casino killed 27 people and injured dozens of others.

Gallery

References

Cambodia–Thailand border crossings
Cities in Cambodia
Ou Chrov District
Populated places in Banteay Meanchey province
Territorial disputes of Cambodia
Territorial disputes of Thailand